Detours is a 2016 road-trip comedy about a newly single New Yorker who must relocate to Florida for a new job; she travels south with her widowed father and her mother’s ashes in a coffee can. Detours was directed by Robert McCaskill from a script by Mara Lesemann (additionally known for Surviving Family). The movie starred Tara Westwood and Carlo Fiorletta; the supporting cast included Richard Kind, Michael Cerveris, Phyllis Somerville, Kim Director, and Paul Sorvino. Cerveris also contributed several original songs to the soundtrack.

Detours premiered at the Sunscreen Film Festival on April 30, 2016, and was released on Amazon Prime on November 25, 2016.

Plot
Detours is the story of a father and daughter who are both starting over, one after the death of a spouse and the other after a divorce.

When Jennifer Giraldi (Tara Westwood) visits her father (Carlo Fiorletta) to announce she is relocating to start a new career, she realizes her father has not left the house since the death of his wife (Kim Director), except for bare necessities, and he has yet to dispose of her mother’s ashes. Jennifer realizes she has lost touch with her dad despite being geographically close. She convinces Dan to tackle the relocation with her and her automated friend, Joe, her GPS with above-average artificial intelligence.

Cast 

 Tara Westwood as Jennifer Giraldi
 Carlo Fiorletta as Dan Giraldi
 Paul Sorvino as Joe DiMaria
 Richard Kind as Sam Jacobson
 Michael Cerveris as Bob O’Connor
 Kim Director as Grace Giraldi
 Phyllis Somerville as Annie Delaney
 Deirdre O’Connell as Beth
 Vanessa Aspillaga as Megan O’Malley
 Michael Pressman as Tom McKinnon

Production 
Detours was shot over 20 days in September and October 2014. Interiors were shot in New Jersey and New York City. Exteriors were shot in New Jersey; North Carolina; Myrtle Beach, South Carolina; Savannah, Georgia; and Saint Petersburg, Florida.

Soundtrack 
The score for Detours was created by Andre Fratto, and featured several original songs.

Release 
Detours premiered at the Sunscreen Film Festival in Saint Petersburg, Florida, on April 30, 2016. It subsequently screened at the Golden Door Film Festival in Jersey City, New Jersey.
Detours received positive reviews from critics: Florida feature editor Jennifer Heit praised the film, saying, “With much candor and a touch of whimsy, Detours explores the issues all of us grapple with - grief, rejection, insecurity - while showing how even just a kernel of hope helps manage life's inevitable messiness.” Richard Propes of The Independent Critic gave the film three stars, calling it “the kind of film that proves to be popular on the indie fest circuit by telling a story so seldom seen in the multiplexes these days.”

Home media 
Detours was released on Amazon Prime on November 25, 2016. TubiTV was added in March 2020 and Plex in May 2021.

Awards and nominations

References

External links 
 

2016 films
2010s comedy road movies
American comedy road movies
Films about artificial intelligence
Films shot in New Jersey
2016 comedy films
2010s English-language films
2010s American films